Philomath High School is a public high school in Philomath, Oregon, United States.

Academics
In 2016, 90.9% of the school's seniors received their high school diplomas.
In 2019, 100% of the school's seniors received their high school diploma, a remarkable feat for a class of 119 students.

Clemens Grant
The Clemens Foundation was established in 1958 by Rex and Ethel Clemens, members of the Philomath community who acquired their wealth in the timber industry. The foundation was established to provide funding for Philomath-area schools, including a college scholarship fund set up for graduates of Philomath High School. The controversy surrounding the scholarship was the subject of the documentary Clear Cut: The Story of Philomath, Oregon.

Athletics 
Philomath High School Warriors compete as a member of the Class 4A Oregon West Conference, operating under the supervision of the Oregon Schools Activities Association (OSAA).

New construction
In 2011, a $20 million construction project was started to rebuild a classroom wing and athletic complex at the school. The plan was soon amended to rebuild most of the school itself, while retaining and reusing structures from the main and auxiliary gymnasiums.

Varsity football scandal
In July 2016, six Philomath High School varsity football players and one coach were cited in connection with “aggravated hazing” incidents at Camp Rilea in Clatsop County. The incidents involved at least 11 alleged victims. The six youths have been cited on charges that, if committed by adults, would constitute the crimes of harassment and assault. All the harassment or attempted harassment charges involve "offensive physical contact with intimate parts," Benton County District Attorney John Haroldson said, adding that the charges are either Class A or Class B misdemeanors.

Notable alumni
 Erica Bartolina – Olympic pole vaulter
 Kevin Boss – former pro football player for the Oakland Raiders and New York Giants
 Tami Maida – the first known quarterback to also become homecoming princess
 Griffon Ramsey – wood carver and social media personality
 Peter Richardson – documentary film director
 Mike Thurman – former pro baseball player for the Montreal Expos and New York Yankees

References

See also
Education in the United States

High schools in Benton County, Oregon
Public high schools in Oregon